Polyrhaphis armiger is a species of beetle in the family Cerambycidae. It was described by Schoenherr in 1817.

References

Polyrhaphidini
Beetles described in 1817